Santos - Skin to Skin is a 2022 American documentary film directed by Kathryn Golden. The film about John Santos and his music.

Synopsis

Cast
 John Santos
 Aida Salazar
 John Calloway
 Eddie Palmieri
 Orestes Vilato
 Raul Rekow
 Omar Sosa 
 Rico Pabon
 Abhijit Banerjee

Release 
Santos - Skin to Skin had its world premiere during SXSW on March 12, 2022.

References

External links
 
 
 

2022 films
2022 documentary films
American documentary films
2020s English-language films
2020s American films